Veliki Vrh pri Litiji is a settlement in the hills above the right bank of the Sava River west of Litija in central Slovenia. The area is part of the traditional region of Lower Carniola and is now included with the rest of the municipality in the Central Sava Statistical Region.

Name
The name of the settlement was changed from Veliki Vrh to Veliki Vrh pri Litiji in 1953.

References

External links
Veliki Vrh pri Litiji on Geopedia

Populated places in the Municipality of Litija